The 1925 European Rowing Championships were rowing championships held on the Vltava (Moldau) in the Czechoslovakian capital Prague on 3 and 4 September. The competition was for men only and they competed in all seven Olympic boat classes (M1x, M2x, M2-, M2+, M4-, M4+, M8+) as they had been rowed at the 1924 Summer Olympics in Paris. It was the first time that the coxless four boat class was part of the regatta.

Medal summary

Footnotes

References

European Rowing Championships
European Rowing Championships
Rowing
Rowing
European Rowing Championships
Rowing
Sports competitions in Prague